Aero Engine Corporation of China (AECC) is a Chinese state-owned aerospace manufacturer focused on the design and development of aeroengine and related technology, comprising 46 affiliated companies including engine manufacturers, institutions and aero-engine factories. The company was established on August 28, 2016. At launch, AECC was to be capitalized with US$7.5 billion by Aviation Industry Corporation of China (AVIC) and Commercial Aircraft Corporation of China, Ltd. (COMAC), China's two main state aerospace companies.

U.S. sanctions 

In November 2020, U.S. President Donald Trump issued an executive order prohibiting U.S. companies and individuals owning shares in companies that the United States Department of Defense believe have links to the People's Liberation Army. The list produced by the United States Department of Defense as being linked to the People's Liberation Army includes AECC.

See also
List of Chinese aircraft engines
Aviation Industry Corporation of China (AVIC)
Commercial Aircraft Corporation of China (COMAC)

References

External links
  

Aerospace companies of China
Aircraft engine manufacturers of China
Gas turbine manufacturers
Chinese companies established in 2016
Government-owned companies of China
Manufacturing companies based in Beijing
Defence companies of the People's Republic of China
Technology companies established in 2016
Manufacturing companies established in 2016
Chinese brands